Francesca Luisa Reale (born August 23, 1994) is an American actress known best for her roles on the Netflix series Haters Back Off and Stranger Things.

Early life
Reale was born and grew up in Los Angeles and received a BFA in acting at New York University. She also studied at the Lee Strasberg Theatre and Film Institute and Stonestreet Studios. She received a 2012 National Youth Arts Award for Outstanding Youth Choreography for "Bordan vi Haller" in Winter Dance Concert, Hamilton Academy of Music.

Career
Reale appeared for two seasons in 2016 and 2017 in the Netflix original series Haters Back Off, in which she played the supporting role of Emily, Miranda’s sister. In 2016 she also played Gabriella Moretti in the episode "Down the Rabbit Hole" on the television series Blue Bloods. 

She played the recurring role of Heather, a lifeguard, on season 3 of Stranger Things, a Netflix original series, where her character is "the centerpiece of a dark mystery." She plays Laura in the 2019 comedy film Yes, God, Yes.

Filmography

Film

Television

Video games

References

External links

Living people
American television actresses
American people of Italian descent
Tisch School of the Arts alumni
Lee Strasberg Theatre and Film Institute alumni
1994 births